Nesley Jean (born 16 March 1985) is a former Bahamian international soccer player, who played as a striker for the Bahamas national team.

Club career
Jean played for local side Bears.

International career
He made his international debut for Bahamas in an October 2001 friendly match against Haiti and has earned a total of 13 caps, scoring 5 goals. He has represented his country in 5 FIFA World Cup qualification matches.

He also played for the national beach soccer team.

International goals
Scores and results list Bahamas' goal tally first.

Managerial career
He retired after injuries and became a coach for the Bahamas U-17 team. He was named national team coach in summer 2014.

References

External links

1985 births
Living people
People from Freeport, Bahamas
Association football wingers
Bahamian footballers
Bahamas international footballers
Bears FC players
Bahamian football managers
Bahamas national football team managers
BFA Senior League players